George Secord (June 18, 1802 – December 1, 1881) was an Ontario political figure. He represented Monck in the Legislative Assembly of Ontario from 1867 to 1871 as a Conservative member.

He was born in St. Davids, Ontario in 1805 and grew up there. In 1831, he married Anna Maria Snider. He served on the district and county council for 22 years and was for a short time warden of Welland County.

External links 
The Canadian parliamentary companion HJ Morgan (1871)

1805 births
1881 deaths
Progressive Conservative Party of Ontario MPPs